Wonthaggi was a railway station located in the town of Wonthaggi, Victoria, Australia. Built to serve the town, as well as the State Coal Mine, the station was the official terminus station of the Wonthaggi line, but two short branch lines continued from the station leading to the Kirrak and Eastern Area mine extensions.

The station operated until the line's closure in 1978, with the station building now preserved and used as a museum. Other pieces or railway infrastructure remaining at the station include a goods shed and crane. Wonthaggi station is the final station on the Bass Coast Rail Trail.

Disused railway stations in Victoria (Australia)
Victorian Heritage Register
Transport in Gippsland (region)
Bass Coast Shire
Listed railway stations in Australia